Bianca Rossi (born 2 May 1954) is an Italian basketball player. She competed in the women's tournament at the 1980 Summer Olympics.

References

External links
 

1954 births
Living people
Italian women's basketball players
Olympic basketball players of Italy
Basketball players at the 1980 Summer Olympics
Sportspeople from the Province of Treviso